Philip Gordon Jacob (1875 – p1927) was a rugby union international who represented England in 1898.

Biography
Philip Jacob was born on 14 May 1875 in Seoni, India, was educated at Bedford School, at St. John's College, Cambridge between 1894 and 1897, and was a rugby blue in 1894, 1895 and 1896.  He played for England against Ireland at Richmond on 5 February 1898. He joined the Indian Civil Service in 1898, rose to become Accountant General of Burma in 1924, and retired in August 1927.

References

1875 births
1927 deaths 
English rugby union players
England international rugby union players
People educated at Bedford School
Alumni of St John's College, Cambridge
Cambridge University R.U.F.C. players
British people in colonial India